Charles Owens (February 22, 1932 – September 7, 2017) was an American professional golfer who has played on the PGA Tour and the Senior PGA Tour.

Owens was born in Winter Haven, Florida. He played football at Florida A&M University and served in the U.S. Army. He suffered injuries to both knees and his left ankle during a parachute jump at Fort Bragg, North Carolina in 1952 which left him handicapped.

Owens turned professional in 1967 and joined the PGA Tour in 1970. During his seven years on the Tour, he won the 1971 Kemper Asheville Open, a "satellite" PGA Tour event. Owens played with a limp and played all golf shots cross-handed. The biggest year of his professional career came on the Senior PGA Tour in 1986, when he won twice in a three tournament span, and finished eighth on the money list with $207,813.

Owens was allowed to use a cart while competing in most instances due to his disability, and once staged a protest at the 1987 U.S. Senior Open against the USGA for its ban on carts at that event.

Owens also is credited with inventing and popularizing the "long (52") style putter" which he used to overcome the yips.

Owens formerly lived in Tampa, Florida and resided in Winter Haven until his death on September 7, 2017. He won the Ben Hogan Award in 1987 and was inducted into the Florida Sports Hall of Fame in 1987 and the African American Golfers Hall of Fame in 2007.

Professional wins (4)

Regular career wins (2)
1971 Kemper Asheville Open (a PGA Tour "satellite" event)
1974 Florida Open

Senior PGA Tour wins (2)

Senior PGA Tour playoff record (1–0)

See also
1970 PGA Tour Qualifying School graduates

References

External links

American male golfers
PGA Tour golfers
PGA Tour Champions golfers
African-American golfers
Golfers from Tampa, Florida
African-American players of American football
Florida A&M Rattlers football players
Players of American football from Tampa, Florida
People from Winter Haven, Florida
Sportspeople from Bartow, Florida
1932 births
2017 deaths
20th-century African-American sportspeople